Khine Thin Kyi  (born 27 September 1971) is a two-time Myanmar Academy Award winning Burmese film actress. She is considered one of the most commercially successful actresses in Burmese cinema.

Early life and education
Khine Thin Kyi' was born on 27 September 1971 in Yangon, Myanmar to parents Mg Mg and his wife Wah Wah Soe. She graduated with B.Sc (Chemistry) from Yangon University.

Career
She made her acting debut with the film Moeyan Tho Pyant Lwant Say Mei Kaythayarzar Toh Ei Arr Mann (မိုးယံသို့ လွင့်ပျံစေမယ့် ကေသရာဇာတို့၏ အားမာန်), directed by Sin Yaw Mg Mg.

Filmography

Film (Cinema)

Beyond the Horizon (2005)
 Lae Sar (လှည့်စား) (2006)
Sone Pyu (စုန်းပြူး) (2013)
Goodmanner exist in mind (2014)
Thu Ngal (သူငယ်) (2017)
Pyan Pay (ပြန်ပေး) (2018)
Sa Yite (စရိုက်) (2019)
 Sein Gorli Ma Yoke Kyar (စိန်ဂေါ်လီမယောက်ျား) (2019)
Yoma Paw Kya Tae Myet Yay  (2019)

TV series
Ma Ma Htake and Heritage House (2016)
Sue Pann Khwai Thwe Bayet Hnint Pay Ywat Leik Nahtaung Sin (2020)

TV show
Myanmar's Got Talent
The Mask Singer Myanmar

Awards and nominations

Personal life
Khaing Thin Kyi married Khant Naing in 2002. They have one daughter, San Htate Htar Oo, is also a model.

References

External links

Living people
Burmese film actresses
1978 births
21st-century Burmese actresses
People from Yangon Region